Furtoug (Furtovg) —  is a rural locality (aul) in Dzheyrakhsky District of the Republic of Ingushetia, Russia. Furtoug is one of the 6 rural localities comprising Dzheyrakh rural settlement. Furtoug was a birthplace of two influential figures in Ingush history - one of the first Ingush scholars Chakh Akhriev and famous revolutionary Gapur Akhriev.

History

Archaeological evidence suggests that the area has been inhabited since the 9th century, with a variety of Bronze Age artifacts, such as bracelets, mirrors, earrings, rings, and ceramics, having been discovered in the local necropolises.

In the 18th century, Furtoug was home to several famous builders of towers, cult, and burial structures, including Dugo Akhriev, Dyatsi Lyanov, and Khazbi Tsurov. The mausoleum of Dugo Akhriev is still standing today.

In the latter half of the 18th century, members of the Tsurov and Lyanov clans of Ossetians settled in Furtoug and assimilated with the local population. In 1880, Russian scientist D. I. Mendeleev visited the area as part of a geological expedition.

On May 15, 1981, a memorial museum was opened in the home of Gapur Akhriev in Furtoug. The museum showcases a variety of artifacts and cultural items, including antiquities, a traditional hearth, kitchen utensils, old photographs, and documents. The region is also home to several clans of Ingush taipas, including the Akhrievs and the Borovs.

Geography 

Furtoug is situated in the Dzheirakh Gorge, at the top of a spur of the Table Mountain, on the right bank of the Armkhi (Kistinka) River. The region is known for its landmarks, including the Furtougsky waterfall, which was named after D. I. Mendeleev.

The village is surrounded by a range of mountain landscapes, with the Dikduk and Myatlom mountains located to the north and northeast, and the Beryr-gala and Duhargisht mountains to the east. The southeast is dominated by the Dzheyrakh mountain range, while the Ezmi and Pkhamat mountains are located to the south.

In the west, the entrance arch to the Dzheyrakh region can be found, beyond which lies the Georgian military road and the village of Chmi.

Infrastructure 

The village has one street - Bodi-Khadzhi street. In 1981 а memorial museum dedicated to Gapur Akhriev has been opened in his home. The museum displays old way of life, documents and photographs associated with its famous owner.

Notable people 
 Chakh Akhriev  the first Ingush ethnographer, historian and lawyer.
 Gapur Akhirev  one of the leaders of revolutionary struggle for power in the North Caucasus.
 Rashid-bek Akhriev  the first North Caucasian pilot
 Khadzhi-Bekir Akhriev  sculptor, the first professional painter in Ingushetia

References 

Rural localities in Ingushetia